Terra Incognita is a role-playing game published by Grey Ghost Press in 2001.

Description
Terra Incognita is a game based on the Fudge rules.

Publication history
Terra Incognita was published by Grey Ghost Press in 2001.

Reception

References

Campaign settings
FUDGE
Historical role-playing games
Role-playing games introduced in 2001
Steampunk role-playing games